Cristiano Ruiu (born February 19, 1979) is an Italian sports journalist and occasional TV presenter of Qui Studio a Voi Stadio (QSVS).

References

Living people
1979 births
Italian sports journalists
Italian male journalists
Mass media people from Milan